Charaxes pleione, the common orange charaxes, or square-winged red charaxes, is a butterfly in the family Nymphalidae. It is found in Guinea, Sierra Leone, Liberia, Ivory Coast, Ghana, Nigeria, Cameroon, Gabon, the Republic of the Congo, the Central African Republic, Angola, the Democratic Republic of the Congo, Uganda, Kenya, Rwanda and Tanzania.

Description
Hindwing between the anal angle and vein 4 nearly straight, at vein 2 feebly angled but not tailed, at vein 4 with a short tail, only about 3 mm. in length. Wings above red-brown; apex and distal margin of the forewing more or less broadly black. Wings beneath with a common dark transverse line, extending from the costal margin of the forewing, just before the apex, to the anal angle of the hindwing. Costal margin of the forewing beneath in cellule 12 white or whitish 
to the end of the cell.-lichas Dbl. male The black colour of the apical area of the forewing extends to the apex of the cell and is either spotted at the inner margin or quite unicolorous - bebra Rothsch. male The black colour at the apex of the forewing does not nearly reach the cell and is deeply incised or spotted with the ground-colour, especially in cellules 4 and 5. Cameroons, Congo region, German East Africa. 

Similar to Charaxes paphianus but forewing apex not attenuated.

Biology
The habitat consists of  forests and woodland savanna.

The larvae feed on Acacia pennata and Acacia brevispica.

Notes on the biology of pleione are given by Kielland (1990) Larsen (1991) and  Larsen (2005)  
<ref>Kielland, J. 1990 Butterflies of Tanzania. Hill House, Melbourne and London: 1-363.</refApollo Books, Svendborg, Denmark: 1-595</ref>

Subspecies
C. p. pleione — Guinea, Sierra Leone, Liberia, Ivory Coast, Ghana, Nigeria
C. p. bebra Rothschild, 1900  — north-eastern Democratic Republic of the Congo, Uganda, south-western Kenya, north-western Tanzania
C. p. congoensis Plantrou, 1989  — south-eastern Nigeria, Cameroon, Gabon, Congo, Central African Republic, Angola, Democratic Republic of the Congo
C. p. delvauxi Turlin, 1987  — south-western Rwanda
C. p. oriens Plantrou, 1989 — coast of Kenya, eastern Tanzania

Taxonomy
Charaxes pleione is a member of the species group Charaxes paphianus. 
The supposed clade members are:

Charaxes paphianus - nominate
Charaxes pleione

Realm
Afrotropical realm

References

Victor Gurney Logan Van Someren, Revisional notes on African Charaxes (Lepidoptera: Nymphalidae). Part IX. Bulletin of the British Museum of Natural History (Entomology) 29 (8):415-487. 
Seitz, A. Die Gross-Schmetterlinge der Erde 13: Die Afrikanischen Tagfalter. Plate XIII 31

External links
Images of C. p. bebra Royal Museum for Central Africa (Albertine Rift Project)
Images of C. p. delvauxi (Albertine Rift Project)
Images of C. p. pleione  (Albertine Rift Project)
C. p. pleione images at Consortium for the Barcode of Life
C. p. bebra images at BOLD
C. p. congoensis images at BOLD
C. p. delvauxi images at BOLD

Butterflies described in 1824
pleione